Paterio Aquino Avenue is the main street in Malabon, northern Metro Manila, Philippines. It runs from Caloocan beginning at the intersection with C-4 Road and terminating at F. Sevilla Boulevard at the Malabon City Hall roundabout. It is named for Paterio Aquino, who served as municipal mayor of Malabon from 1946 to 1951 and from 1956 to 1959. The street is sometimes called Letre Road, named for the old barrio in Malabon through which it passes. The section west of Tonsuya Bridge in Barangays San Agustin and Tañong in Malabon is alternatively named as Rizal Avenue Extension.

This six-lane undivided street houses several notable Malabon establishments including the Malabon City Hall, San Bartolome Church, St. James Academy, Our Lady of Lourdes Cemetery, and Pescadores Restaurant. It is included in the list of most flood-prone areas in the metropolis by the Metro Manila Development Authority.

The street was formerly part of the Manila Circumferential Road (Route 54 / Highway 54) from the 1940s to 1950s.

References

External links

Streets in Metro Manila
Malabon